Samuel Elden Scholl (born November 11, 1977) is an American college basketball coach who is the former head men's basketball coach at the University of San Diego.

Playing career
Scholl started his playing career at Tacoma Community College for two seasons before transferring to the University of San Diego to complete his playing eligibility under Brad Holland with the San Diego Toreros.

Coaching career
After graduation, Scholl joined Holland's staff and stayed with the Toreros for seven seasons, where he was part of the team's 2003 NCAA tournament appearance. In 2007, Scholl joined Kerry Keating's staff at Santa Clara, where he stayed until 2015, and was a part of the school's 2011 CIT Championship and 2013 CBI Championship winning squads.

Scholl rejoined the Toreros staff under Lamont Smith. In February 2018, Smith was placed on leave pending a domestic violence charge against him, and resigned 10 days after his arrest, leaving Scholl to coach the team on an interim basis. Scholl coached the team in the 2018 CIT, reaching the quarterfinals before falling to eventual champion Northern Colorado.

On April 2, 2018, San Diego lifted the interim tag and named Scholl the permanent head coach, the 13th head coach in Toreros history.

On March 6, 2022, San Diego announced that Scholl would not return as head coach, ending his 4-season tenure.

Head coaching record

NCAA DI

‡ Scholl coached final 4 games.

References

1977 births
Living people
American men's basketball coaches
Basketball coaches from Washington (state)
Basketball players from Washington (state)
College men's basketball head coaches in the United States
Junior college men's basketball players in the United States
People from Gig Harbor, Washington
San Diego Toreros men's basketball coaches
San Diego Toreros men's basketball players
Santa Clara Broncos men's basketball coaches
Sportspeople from the Seattle metropolitan area
American men's basketball players